Yucca valida is a plant species in the family Asparagaceae, native to the Mexican states of Baja California, Baja California Sur, Sonora, and Sinaloa. The common name is datilillo.

Yucca valida is a large, branched species up to 7 m (23 feet) tall. Leaves are rigid and lance-like, up to 35 cm (14 inches) long. Dead leaves hang onto the plant below the living leaves, forming a skirt around the trunk. Flowers are white, forming juicy, edible black fruits up to 4.5 cm (1.8 inches) long.

References

valida
Plants described in 1889
Flora of Northwestern Mexico